Mario Bianchini (14 May 1911 – 1 June 1957) was an Italian boxer who competed in the 1932 Summer Olympics.  He took the Italian Welterweight title on 26 January 1938 in Rome.

Bianchini was born in Rome, Italy on 13 May 1911. In 1932 he finished fourth in the lightweight class after losing the bronze medal bout to Nathan Bor.

Taking the Italian welterweight title, 1938
He won the Italian Welterweight title against Amadeo Deyana in a twelve round points decision on 26 January 1938 in Rome.

His grandson David Bianchini was a professional association football player, notably for then serie A side Foggia in the early 1990s.

References

External links
 
 Italian Olympians BIAN-BIAV 

1911 births
1957 deaths
Lightweight boxers
Olympic boxers of Italy
Boxers at the 1932 Summer Olympics
Italian male boxers